Wilfred Kennedy "Bucko" McDonald (October 31, 1911 – July 19, 1991) was a Canadian professional hockey and lacrosse player, coach, and politician.

Born in Fergus, Ontario, he played for the Detroit Red Wings, Toronto Maple Leafs, and New York Rangers between 1935 and 1945. He won the Stanley Cup three times in his career, in 1936 and 1937 with Detroit and in 1942 with Toronto.

McDonald was also an accomplished lacrosse player, who won a Mann Cup and was inducted into the Canadian Lacrosse Hall of Fame in 1971. The Ontario Lacrosse Association honoured McDonald by naming an award after him; the highest-scoring player is awarded the Bucko McDonald Trophy.

In 1945, he was elected to the House of Commons of Canada in the Ontario riding of Parry Sound. A Liberal, he was re-elected in 1949 and 1953. After leaving politics, he was the head coach for the Rochester Americans. He coached Bobby Orr when he was 11 and 12.

Career statistics

Regular season and playoffs

References

External links
 
 

1911 births
1991 deaths
Buffalo Bisons (IHL) players
Canadian ice hockey coaches
Canadian ice hockey defencemen
Canadian lacrosse players
Canadian sportsperson-politicians
Detroit Olympics (IHL) players
Detroit Red Wings players
Hull Volants players
Ice hockey people from Ontario
Lacrosse people from Ontario
Liberal Party of Canada MPs
Members of the House of Commons of Canada from Ontario
New York Rangers players
People from Centre Wellington
Providence Reds players
Rochester Americans coaches
Stanley Cup champions
Toronto Maple Leafs players